Length in its basic meaning is the long dimension of an object.

Length may also refer to:

Mathematics
Arc length, the distance between two points along a section of a curve.
Length of a sequence or tuple, the number of terms. (The length of an -tuple is )
Length of a module, in abstract algebra
Length of a polynomial, the sum of the magnitudes of the coefficients of a polynomial
Length of a vector, the size of a vector

Other uses
Length (phonetics), in phonetics
Vowel length, the perceived duration of a vowel sound
Geminate consonant, the articulation of a consonant for a longer period of time than that of a single instance
Line and length, the direction and point of bouncing on the pitch of a delivery in cricket
Horse length, the length of a horse in equestrianism
Length overall, the maximum length of a vessel's hull measured parallel to the waterline